Canton Creek is a stream in the U.S. state of Georgia. It is a tributary to the Etowah River.

Canton Creek flows through the city of Canton, Georgia, from which it takes its name.

References

Rivers of Georgia (U.S. state)
Rivers of Cherokee County, Georgia